"Nobody Is Ever Missing" is the tenth and final episode of the first season of the HBO satirical comedy-drama television series Succession. It was written by series showrunner Jesse Armstrong and directed by Mark Mylod, and aired on August 5, 2018.

The episode takes place at Shiv and Tom's wedding, which serves as a backdrop for various ongoing conflicts within the Roy family, chiefly Kendall's attempted takeover of Waystar RoyCo.

Plot
On the day of Shiv and Tom's wedding, the family gathers for photos while Kendall and Stewy sequester themselves away to finalize the announcement of their takeover bid for Waystar RoyCo. Kendall delivers the official documents to Logan, confirming that it is indeed a bear hug. Logan is furious and kicks Kendall out of his room, but begins scrambling to get ahead of the situation with his legal team immediately afterwards.

Prior to the reception, Roman excuses himself to the restroom to watch the live broadcast of a Japanese satellite launch, which Logan had placed under his responsibility. However, the rocket explodes on the launchpad. Roman later feigns surprise when Gerri confronts him about it. Meanwhile, Connor informs Willa that he intends to run for President of the United States. A stressed Logan joins the crowd amidst his legal crisis, and angrily fires a young waiter for spilling champagne on his arm. The waiter is immediately met with an NDA and cash settlement.

The wedding reception begins that night and the Roys give their speeches for Shiv and Tom. Logan gathers his children to another room to inform them of Kendall's takeover bid, infuriating all of them. Kendall arrives soon after and confirms his plans, seemingly indifferent to the anger of his siblings. Afterwards, he repeatedly asks Stewy for cocaine, but Stewy declines in order to preserve Kendall's focus for the night.

Roman is relieved to learn from Gerri that no one died in the rocket explosion. Connor announces his presidential ambitions to his siblings. Kendall runs into Greg outside the castle, who reveals that he kept copies of the documents pertaining to crimes on Waystar's cruises and uses them as leverage to request a better position within the company. Kendall is impressed and agrees to Greg's wishes. Shiv and Tom return to their bedroom, where Shiv confides to Tom that she feels she is better suited for a non-monogamous relationship, and admits her affair with Nate. Tom forgives her and ejects Nate from the wedding.

Kendall wanders outside the castle searching for drugs and runs into Andrew Dodds, the waiter whom Logan had fired earlier. The two do ketamine together; an intoxicated Kendall decides to drive towards town in search of cocaine. As they approach a bridge, they swerve to avoid hitting a deer, landing the car into nearby water. Unable to save Dodds from drowning, Kendall flees the scene and returns to the wedding in shock. Having lost his keycard in the crash, Kendall breaks into his own bedroom, showers, and rejoins the crowd to keep up appearances with his family.

The police investigate the case the following morning, and recover Kendall's room key at the crash site. Logan concocts a cover story suggesting that Dodds stole Kendall's key card, but privately tells Kendall he knows he is responsible. Logan promises to make the case go away if Kendall calls off the takeover and attends rehab. Kendall obliges and breaks down crying in his father's arms.

Production

"Nobody Is Ever Missing" was written by Succession showrunner Jesse Armstrong and directed by Mark Mylod in his fourth episode for the series. The episode's title derives from a line in John Berryman's "Dream Song 29". The episode, along with the penultimate episode of the season, "Pre-Nuptial", was filmed at Eastnor Castle in Herefordshire, England. The castle has frequently featured on other television series and is often used as a real-life wedding locale. 

The writers used Senator Ted Kennedy's car accident in 1969 at Chappaquiddick as inspiration for Kendall's accident. Actor Jeremy Strong recounted that his scenes of Kendall leaving the car crash were filmed towards "4 in the morning" under freezing rain, and that he requested director Mylod to shoot most of the 10-minute scene in a single session to preserve the dramatic tension. The final exchange between Logan and Kendall is reminiscent of Kennedy's own confession of the Chappaquiddick incident to his father, as recounted in Joe McGinniss' biography The Last Brother. Strong cited  The Man Who Owns The News, Michael Wolff's biography on Rupert Murdoch, in describing Logan's character as having the "language of strength" (whereas his son does not), which he felt summarized the dynamic between the two characters by the end of the season.

Reception

Ratings
Upon airing, the episode was watched by 0.73 million viewers, with an 18-49 rating of 0.20. It has the series' highest live viewership ratings to date.

Critical reception
"Nobody Is Ever Missing" received critical acclaim. Randall Colburn of The A.V. Club gave the episode an A−, praising the series and Armstrong for avoiding trying to make the characters likeable and committing to its moral ambiguity while still adding depth to its characterization. Colburn reserved praise for Strong's performance, calling it "subtle, layered, and deeply vulnerable" and remarking on the character's improvement over the course of the season. Karen Han wrote in a review for Vox, "It's that refusal to fall into a strictly black-and-white matrix that ultimately makes the Succession finale so affecting, and so difficult to watch. The balance between comedy and tragedy finally tips, crashing into the latter category, and it's a testament to the series that it all comes together." Writing for Forbes, Carolyn Lipka stated, "When people call Succession a satire it does the show a disservice—this is a tried and true Shakespearean drama about the ways in which absolute power rots you from the inside."

Accolades
For the episode, creator Jesse Armstrong received a Primetime Emmy Award for Outstanding Writing for a Drama Series in 2019.

References

External links
 "Nobody Is Ever Missing" at HBO
 

2018 American television episodes
Emmy Award-winning episodes
Succession (TV series)
Television episodes set in England
Television episodes about weddings